The Feasts of Belshazzar, or a Night with Stalin or  is a 1989 film adaptation of Fazil Iskander's eponymous novella directed by Yuri Kara. In the 1990s the film was screened in the United States, including at the United States Congress. The title is a reference to Belshazzar's feast, a chapter of the Book of Daniel.

Plot
On 20 September 1906, a brazen robbery is committed on the passenger steamer "Tsesarevich Georgiy" near Sukhumi, Russian Empire. Several hirsute men threatening with weapons, break open a cashbox which is transporting a large amount of money and having captured several hostages land on shore. Then they mercilessly kill the hostages, who are praying for mercy, and disappear into the mountains. After some time the leader and his lieutenant shoot and kill the accomplices and then the lieutenant gets a lead cartridge through his head. The bloody leader remains alone with the loot but a shepherd boy named Sandro becomes an involuntary witness of his reprisal. The grim villain looks attentively at the frozen in terror teenager and... goes away by the mountainous road.

Years pass. Sandro grows up and becomes participant of an Abkhazian dance ensemble. One evening in 1935 by the order of chief party leader of Abkhazia, Nestor Lakoba, the entire ensemble is called to perform before Joseph Stalin. The great leader comes with his associates to Abkhazia to have a good rest. Stalin watches the dances with pleasure and listens to the songs of the peoples of the Caucasus, drinks a lot, and merrily makes fun of others. During the dance competition blindfolded Sandro manages to roll on his knees straight to the feet of Stalin. This delights Stalin, he praises the skillful dancer but suddenly becoming glum asks a strange question-statement: "Somewhere I have seen you ..." Sandro, pale with fear, finds a convincing excuse but then remembers! The same ruthless murderer whom Sandro met in his distant childhood was in fact, Joseph Stalin.

After the feast, people involved begin disappearing.

Cast
 Aleksei Petrenko – Joseph Stalin
 Aleksandr Feklistov – Uncle Sandro
 Valentin Gaft – Lavrentiy Beria
 Larisa Belogurova – Nina Beria, Lavrentiy Beria's wife 
 Yevgeniy Yevstigneyev – Mikhail Kalinin
 Sergei Nikonenko – Kliment Voroshilov
 Aleksei Safonov – Nestor Lakoba
 Tamara Yandieva – Saria Lakoba, Nestor Lakoba's wife 
 Mikhail Kononov – sanatorium director
 Anatoly Guzenko – Platon Pantsulaya, the head of the dance ensemble
 Sergey Nikolaev – chef

References

External links

1989 films
1980s biographical drama films
1980s historical drama films
Films about Joseph Stalin
Films based on Russian novels
Films set in 1906
Films set in Georgia (country)
Films set in the Russian Empire
Films set in the Soviet Union
Soviet biographical drama films
Soviet historical drama films
1980s Russian-language films
Gorky Film Studio films